The Local Government Act 1985 is an Act of Parliament in the United Kingdom. Its main effect was to abolish the six county councils of the metropolitan counties that had been set up in 1974, 11 years earlier, by the Local Government Act 1972, along with the Greater London Council that had been established in 1965. In their place many single purpose authorities known collectively as 'joint authorities' were established for fire service, police and passenger transport. An ad hoc education authority was established for Inner London and a planning authority for Greater London. The legislation permitted councils to form 'joint arrangements' for waste disposal and other services that they wished to provide together. Time-limited residuary bodies were created to dispose of the assets of the former authorities.

Background
Following the victory of the Conservative Party at the 1979 general election, Margaret Thatcher's government were involved in a series of high-profile disputes with the GLC and Metropolitan County Councils. All of the authorities were controlled by, or came under the control of the opposition Labour Party during Thatcher's first term. The Conservative manifesto for the 1983 general election pledged their abolition, describing the councils as "a wasteful and unnecessary tier of government". Having won a landslide victory in the 1983 General Election, the government published a white paper in October of that year, Streamlining the cities. Its proposals formed the basis of the Local Government Bill.

Provisions
The core provision, section 1, stated that "the Greater London Council; and the metropolitan county councils" shall cease to exist. It came into effect on 1 April 1986, with some powers being devolved to the metropolitan boroughs themselves and London boroughs and others to joint authorities (such as for fire or police purposes) consisting of members of each of the metropolitan district councils within each county. At the time of the Act, one third of the population of England were living in Greater London and the metropolitan counties.

Time-limited residuary bodies were created to handle the disposal of the councils' assets. Part III of the Act also set up the Inner London Education Authority, which had previously been a committee of the GLC responsible for education in Inner London, as a directly elected body. This was to remain in existence for only three years.

The Local Government Act 1972 allowed councils to voluntarily form joint committees to provide services together and the Local Government Act 1985 extended this principle by directing local authorities to form some shared arrangements whilst permitting them to form others as they wished.

Local authorities abolished by Part I
Six metropolitan county councils were abolished and the local authority of Greater London. 
Greater London Council
Greater Manchester County Council
Merseyside County Council
South Yorkshire County Council
Tyne and Wear County Council
West Midlands County Council
West Yorkshire County Council

Joint committees established by Part II
Joint planning committee for Greater London
Greater Manchester Trading Standards Joint Committee
Merseyside County Trading Standards Joint Committee
South Yorkshire Trading Standards Joint Committee
Tyne and Wear Trading Standards Joint Committee
West Midlands Trading Standards Joint Committee
West Yorkshire Trading Standards Joint Committee

Joint arrangements established by Part II
East London Waste Authority
Greater Manchester Waste Disposal Authority
Merseyside Waste Disposal Authority
North London Waste Authority
Western Riverside Waste Authority
West London Waste Authority

Ad hoc authorities established by Part III
Inner London Education Authority

Note: The outer London borough councils and metropolitan district councils were already education authorities.

Joint authorities established by Part IV
A number of single purpose authorities were established, collectively known as joint authorities in the legislation.

Fire and civil defence authorities
Greater Manchester Fire and Civil Defence Authority
London Fire and Civil Defence Authority
Merseyside Fire and Civil Defence Authority
South Yorkshire Fire and Civil Defence Authority
Tyne and Wear Fire and Civil Defence Authority
West Midlands Fire and Civil Defence Authority
West Yorkshire Fire and Civil Defence Authority

Passenger transport authorities
Greater Manchester Passenger Transport Authority
Merseyside Passenger Transport Authority
South Yorkshire Passenger Transport Authority
Tyne and Wear Passenger Transport Authority
West Midlands Passenger Transport Authority
West Yorkshire Passenger Transport Authority

Note: London Regional Transport was established separately by the London Regional Transport Act 1984.

Police authorities
Greater Manchester Police Authority
Merseyside Police Authority
Northumbria Police Authority
South Yorkshire Police Authority
West Midlands Police Authority
West Yorkshire Police Authority

Note: The Metropolitan Police was under the control of the Home Office and unaffected by the legislation.

Ad hoc bodies established by Part V
London Boroughs Grants Committee

Residuary bodies established by Part VII
Greater Manchester Residuary Body
London Residuary Body
Merseyside Residuary Body
South Yorkshire Residuary Body
Tyne and Wear Residuary Body
West Midlands Residuary Body
West Yorkshire Residuary Body

Ad hoc bodies established by Part IX
London Research Centre

References

United Kingdom Acts of Parliament 1985
Acts of the Parliament of the United Kingdom concerning England
Local government legislation in England and Wales